Artur Fyodorovich Kuznetsov (born 4 October 1972) is a Russian former professional footballer.

Club career
He made his professional debut in the Soviet Second League B in 1990 for FC Shakhtyor Shakhty.

References

1972 births
Sportspeople from Sochi
Living people
Soviet footballers
Russian footballers
Russia under-21 international footballers
Association football midfielders
FC Zhemchuzhina Sochi players
FC Lokomotiv Nizhny Novgorod players
FC Neftekhimik Nizhnekamsk players
FC SKA Rostov-on-Don players
Russian Premier League players